Manila Carnival was an annual carnival festival held in Manila during the early American colonial period up to the time before the Second World War. It was organized by the American colonial administration to celebrate harmonious US and Philippine relations. The Carnival also showcased the commercial, industrial and agricultural progress of the Philippines. The highlight of the event is the crowning of the Carnival Queens.

History
The fabled Manila Carnival was first held on February 1908. The carnival's original organizer was an American colonel named Captain George T. Langhorne who asked the Philippine Assembly for 50,000 pesos to build a cockpit, exhibit "half-naked" Igorot tribesmen and set up curiosities. Horrified by the plan of the proposed carnival, Governor General James Smith transformed the planned freak show into a ritual celebrating the Philippine-American progress in the islands. Secretary of Commerce Cameron Forbes took charge of the preparation and asked 15,000 instead of 50,000 from the Assembly. He planned to raise another 15,000 by private subscription campaigns such as the Carnival Queen contest.

The site of the Manila Carnival was the old Wallace Field that was just off the present Luneta Park; occupied by the present-day National Library of the Philippines.

During those two weeks of carnival, Wallace Field was walled with sawali and given a decorative facade brilliant with lights and adornments. A variety of shows were presented like circus, vaudevilles, slapstick comedies, and the grand theatrical presentation of Borromeo Lou, the great impresario of the era. Such stars as Atang de la Rama, Katy de la Cruz, Canuplin, Dionisia Castro, often staged performances that audiences loved.

The entrance fee range from 50 centavos and up and one can buy at the gate a mask, a horn and a bag of confetti. The children wore a harlequin, a clown's costume, or a  dunce cap, while the elder ones wore dominoes or similar attractive attires.

The scene was like New Year's Eve with all the gaiety, laughter and gossips in old Manila circling around. Everyone seemed to be tooting horns or throwing confetti.

Parades
There were five parades during the carnival season:

1. The opening day parade, which was mostly clown and circus
2. The military parade, mostly Americans and Scouts
3. The civic educational parade in which the public schools of Manila participated, and wherein each school compete for the best and most original floats
4. The business and industrial parade in which the international community participated
5. The floral parade, which is the highlight parade of the carnival. The parade featured the competing carnival beauties as well as the newly crowned Carnival Queen, her consort, and her court.

Carnival Queens
The highlight of the Manila Carnival is the crowning of the Carnival Queen by the Carnival mascot Billiken. Cameron Forbes and the carnival promoters established the Carnival Queen contest. The Queen will be selected through purchase of ballots through newspaper clippings. Initially, Forbes decided to restrict the contest to the daughters of the wealthiest families from the capital city of Manila but eventually accepted entries from different parts of the country. The Queen was voted through a system of money ballots or magazine coupons. Philippine magazines like Liwayway, Telembang and Lipang Kalabaw had such coupons inserted in their pages.

The Carnival Queens dressed the most beautiful costumes of the parade, ranging from Egyptian inspired to Siamese to that of the Arabian Scheherazade.

The first Manila Carnival in 1908 elected two queens representing the Oriental beauty and the Western beauty (called Occident) – Pura Villanueva from Iloilo City, Iloilo (Queen of the Orient) and Marjorie Radcliffe Colton from Galesburg, Illinois (Queen of the Occident). The only other time this happened was in 1920 Manila Carnival. In 1912, for the first time aside from the carnival queen the contest chose four ladies to represent Luzon, Visayas, Mindanao and American homeland. In 1913, three women representing Luzon, Visayas and Mindanao were named as co-winners of the Manila Carnival. The first and only American woman to solely win as Carnival Queen was Mela Kamakee Fairchild (born in Oakland, California in 1898) in the 1917 Manila Carnival. Two queens were also chosen in 1926 to elect the last to be called as the Carnival Queen (Socorro Henson) and the very first Miss Philippines (Anita Agoncillo Noble)

Manila Carnival Queen is the precursor of various national pageants in the Philippines.

Titleholders

National Beauty Contest

These are the candidates for the national beauty contests of the Manila Carnival.

1st National Beauty Contest

2nd National Beauty Contest

See also 
 History of the Philippines (1898-1946)
Binibining Pilipinas
Miss Philippines Earth
Miss Republic of the Philippines
 Miss World Philippines

Further reading and viewing

Books and Magazines
 Lipang Kalabaw Vol.3, No. 56 1923 (carries interesting articles about the Manila Carnivals)
 Telembang Magazine 1922–24
 Joaquin, Nick "Manila, My Manila", 1979, Manila Philippines
 McCoy Alfred and Roces Alfredo, "Philippine Cartoons" 1983, Manila, Philippines

References

External links 

 Manila Carnivals 1908–1939, A Pictorial History of the "Greatest Annual Event in the Orient". Alex R. Castro
 Manila Carnival 1908–1939
 Philippine Manila Carnival Queens, Pinoy Kollektor
 Manila Carnival Royalty
 Manila Carnivals 1908–1939 Flickr Group
 Manila Carnival 1932 Fort Drum Under Reconstruction
 Manila Carnival Tumblr

Carnivals in the Philippines
Beauty pageants in the Philippines
History of Manila
Culture in Manila
Recurring events established in 1908
Recurring events disestablished in 1939